Tijerina is a surname. Notable people with the surname include:

Arturo de la Garza Tijerina (born 1958), Mexican politician 
Felix Tijerina (1905–1965), Mexican-American restaurateur, activist and philanthropist
Marco Aurelio Martínez Tijerina (1964/65–2010), Mexican journalist
Reies Tijerina (1926–2015), American activist
Tano Tijerina (born 1974), American rancher and businessman